Nogometni klub Sava Kranj, commonly referred to as NK Sava Kranj or simply Sava Kranj, is a Slovenian football club from Kranj which competes in the Slovenian Third League. The club was founded in 1933. Sava Kranj was known as NK Mladost Kranj between 1954 and 1974.

Honours
Slovenian Fourth Division
Winners: 1997–98, 2007–08, 2011–12, 2012–13

Slovenian Fifth Division
Winners: 2003–04

References

External links
NK Sava Kranj at NZS 

Association football clubs established in 1933
Football clubs in Slovenia
1933 establishments in Slovenia
Sport in Kranj